Coleophora dipalliata is a moth of the family Coleophoridae. It is found in Turkmenistan.

The larvae feed on Astragalus xiphidioides. They feed on the leaves of their host plant.

References

dipalliata
Moths described in 1981
Moths of Asia